Jean-Jacques Simard (born 1945) is a Québécois professor and sociologist.

He has been professor of sociology at Université Laval since 1976.

He began the first project into modern autonomous Inuit government in Canada.  A critic of hydroelectric development in Baie-James, he left public function to become a counsellor for Inuit dissidents in the famous James Bay and Northern Quebec Agreement.

The Bélanger-Campeau Commission called him to give evidence in the aboriginal question.

From 1988–1989, he edited Recherches sociographiques, a journal published by the Département de sociologie, Faculté des sciences sociales of Université Laval, Quebec City.

Works
 La longue marche des technocrates, 1979.. sur le site Les Classiques des sciences sociales.
Tendances nordiques – Les changements sociaux, 1970–1990, chez les Cris et Inuits du Québec, 1995
La Réduction: l’Autochtone inventé et les Amérindiens d’aujourd’hui, 2004

Honours

2004 – Governor General's Awards, La Réduction: l’Autochtone inventé et les Amérindiens d’aujourd’hui

References

Writers from Quebec
Canadian sociologists
1945 births
Academic staff of Université Laval
Living people
Governor General's Award-winning non-fiction writers